Earl Wagner may refer to:

 Earl T. Wagner (1908–1990), U.S. Representative from Ohio
 J. Earl Wagner (1861–1943), businessman from Philadelphia, Pennsylvania
 Earl Wagner (racing driver) American race car driver